Bistonina is a Neotropical genus of butterflies in the family Lycaenidae.

Species
Bistonina erema (Hewitson, 1867)
Bistonina biston (Möschler, 1877)
Bistonina bactriana (Hewitson, 1868)
Bistonina feretria (Hewitson, 1878)
Bistonina mantica (Druce, 1907)
Bistonina olbia (Hewitson, 1867)

References

Eumaeini
Lycaenidae of South America
Lycaenidae genera